The 2014 Pacific Rim Championships were held from 9 April to 12 April 2014 in Richmond, British Columbia.

Overall medal table

Medalists

Artistic gymnastics

Men's events

Women's events

Rhythmic gymnastics

^Medals were also awarded for each round, 5 Hoops (Gold: China, Silver: Singapore, Bronze: United States) and 5 Clubs (Gold: China, Silver: United States, Bronze: Canada)

Trampoline

References

2014
Pacific Rim Gymnastics Championships
International gymnastics competitions hosted by Canada
Pacific Rim Gymnastics
Richmond, British Columbia
Pacific Rim Gymnastics
Pacific Rim Gymnastics